Southern Asia Bible College (SABC) is a Bible college of the Assemblies of God in Bangalore, India.

History
Established in 1951, SABC is a theological training institution of the Assemblies of God in Southern Asia. It was founded by Alfred Cawston as 'Southern Asia Bible Institute' with a vision to prepare men and women for the work of Christian ministry in Southern Asia. Today it has grown to be one of the largest theological institutions in Asia with over 300 students. More than 2500 alumni of SABC serve in various ministries throughout Southern Asia and other nations of the world.

SABC operates under the leadership of the Board of Directors of Assemblies of God in Southern Asia, which consists of leaders representing the Assemblies of God constituencies in Southern Asia and the Assemblies of God World Mission. Southern Asia Bible College is an active member of The Evangelical Fellowship of India (EFI), The Asia Theological Association (ATA) and The Assemblies of God Association for Theological Education in Southern Asia (AGATESA).

Alumni
Its former Principal/President Dr. A.C. George is one of the first from among the Pentecostal leaders in India with a Ph.D. Other SABC graduates include Dr. Ivan Satyavrata, the senior pastor of the Assembly of God Church in Kolkata, Dr.D. Mohan, senior pastor of the New Life Assembly of God Church in Chennai, and Rev. Paul Thangiah, the senior pastor of the Full Gospel Assembly of God Church in Bangalore.

A large percentage of the graduates of Southern Asia Bible are engaged in Christian ministry. A smaller percentage have continued in secular work, in fields such as journalism, social work, hospital work, teaching and administration. Many of its students have also pioneered Christian works all across the globe. Much of The Assemblies of God leadership in India have been trained at SABC.

Campus
The present campus in Kothanur established by Rev. Dr. Andrew McDearmid, one of the last American missionary principals of SABC.
It is a  campus in Bangalore city. There is residential facility for 150 single men, 50 single women and 12 apartments for married students. There are also adequate number of lecture halls, a large auditorium for community functions, a multi-media conference facility, a chapel for times of corporate worship, a multi-purpose games field and sports room, a spacious cafeteria, residences for faculty and staff, and a guest-house. The majority of these buildings have been added since the first students and staff transferred to the "new campus" in the summer of 1970. The college serves a community of about 270 students. Over 25 staff and 15 faculty members work at the college under Rev. Pravinkumar Israel, president of the college since April 2006.

Programs Offered
SABC offers the following programs:
 Master of Divinity (M.Div.), a three-year (six semester) degree program designed for graduates of recognised Universities.
 Diploma in Christian Ministry, a one-year (two-semester) diploma program designed for mature candidates involved in Christian Ministry.
 Doctor of Ministry (D.Min.), an in-service program for those with at least five years in ministry after M.Div.

The Distance Learning Department of SABC offers Bachelor of Theology (Th.B.) and Master of Divinity programs by distance learning. Efforts are underway to launch internet based e-learning programs.

The degree programs are accredited by The Asia Theological Association.

The Cawston Learning Resource Centre
The CLRC, a modern computerized learning resource facility, with more than 40,000 volumes of books, periodicals, and other audio-visual resources has enhanced the learning facility. The Mission Resource Center and the Pentecostal Study Center in the CLRC cater to specific interest groups in training.

External links
 Official website

Bible colleges
Educational institutions established in 1951
1951 establishments in Mysore State